HMS Janissary or Janizary was a gun-boat that served in the Royal Navy's Egyptian campaign (8 March to 2 September 1801). She appears in the records only in connection with the campaign and her origins before 1800 or service after 1801 are lost. Her name honours the Janissaries, a body of Ottoman troops.

On 2 March, while under the command of Lieutenant John Whilley, Janissary, together with the cutter  and the gun-vessel , protected the left flank during the landing of troops in Aboukir Bay. The cutter , schooner , and the gun-vessel Negresse covered the right flank. Janissarys officers and crew therefore qualified for the clasp "Egypt" to the Naval General Service Medal that the Admiralty authorised in 1850 to all surviving claimants.

Citations, and references
Citations

References
 

Gunvessels of the Royal Navy